Adrianna So (born Malak So Shdifat) is a Filipina actress known for her role as Pearl in Gameboys.

Personal life
So was born Malak So Shdifat in Zarqa governorate, Jordan and moved to the Philippines at age five.

She attended high school at Hijas De Jesus and graduated at La Consolacion College, Manila with a Mass Communications degree, major in Advertising.

Career

So started her television career in 2012 when she joined TV5's now-defunct reality show Artista Academy. She became part of the Final 6 and went on to appear in various drama series on TV5. In 2017, she signed with The IdeaFirst Company and changed her screen name to Adrianna So, stating that it is close to her heart. In 2020, she was cast as quirky and supportive Pearl Gatdula in the Filipino Boys' Love (BL) web series Gameboys starring Kokoy De Santos and Elijah Canlas.

Filmography

Series

Film

Awards and nominations

References 

1992 births
Living people
Filipino film actresses
Filipino television actresses
People from Zarqa
21st-century Filipino actresses